The Lies We Tell Ourselves, is an extended play album by American rock band thelastplaceyoulook. It was released on May 30, 2006 and produced by John Glover and Marke Townsend. The first single is "I've Got a Question for You ... Why Are You Still Here?". Space City Rock categorized the album as having a much different sound from the band's full-length follow up See The Light Inside You.

Track listing
"I've Got a Question for You ... Why Are You Still Here?" – 4:13
"They Only Give Medals to Heroes" – 4:00
"No, This Song Wasn't About You" – 4:56
"Brass Rings Don't Hold Water in the Desert" – 4:18
"How Do You Say F**K Off in Russian? – 5:47

Album credits
All songs written by thelastplaceyoulook

Band
Justin Nava – vocals
Kevin Pool – bass & vocals
Derek Young – guitar
Richard Sherwood – guitar
Mikey Garcia – drums
Andy Moths – drums (former member)

Production
John Glover – Producer, Engineering, Mixing
Marke Townsend – Producer
thelastplaceyoulook – Producers
Justin Nava – Producer, Engineering

References

External links
Official band site

2006 debut EPs
Thelastplaceyoulook EPs